Wanstead Roman Villa was a Roman villa on an unknown site in what is now Wanstead Park. Archaeological excavations carried out in 1985  indicated a Roman presence here from the 1st to the 5th century AD, but did not locate any specific site of a Roman villa.

A mosaic discovered in 1715 by gardener Adam Holt was described as:

According to Lethieullier, owner of the adjacent Aldersbrook Manor, the pavement "was situated on a gentle gravely ascent towards the north, and at a small distance from the south end of it I remember a well of exceeding fine water, now absorbed in a great pond". Lethieullier's first letter mentions "foundations", which he believed to be Roman, at some distance to the south of the pavement, and on the very edge of the Wanstead estate "about 300 yards due south from the said well and pavement, there were, in my memory, the ruins of foundations to be seen, though now destroyed by planting trees round the park pales". A second letter also mentions the "foundation of a Roman building", "at a small distance" from the site of the pavement. Lethieullier goes on to state that in the summer of 1746 workmen showed him "urns" "of the coarsest earth" and bones they had discovered, which he believed to be the remains of Roman burials, as well as at least three coins.

The exact locations of the Roman remains described by Smart Lethieullier were subsequently lost although Jack Elsden Tuffs undertook further archaeological work during the 1960s. A limited ground-penetrating radar survey was undertaken in February 2007 running north–south to a point just north of the refreshment hut and showed anomalies consistent with the buried foundations of a large masonry building running diagonally across the survey area. What appeared to be at least two rooms were visible which are considered likely to date from the Roman period.

References

Sources 
Wanstead House and the Parklands - a History, www.wansteadwildlife.org.uk. (June 2010). This article has drawn heavily from this source.
Cornish, Alan. M.Sc. Wanstead Park - A Chronicle. (Originally published by the Friends of Wanstead Parklands in  1982, updated and republished by Wanstead Parklands Community Project in 2006.)

External links
City of London website
Wren Conservation Group
The Friends of Wanstead Parklands

History of the London Borough of Redbridge
Former buildings and structures in the London Borough of Redbridge
Villas in Roman Britain